Ten Mile Rocks are a granite rock formation approximately  east of Norseman and approximately  west of Balladonia in the Goldfields-Esperance region of Western Australia. 

The rocks are part of the Biranup Complex, a belt forming the north western portion of the Albany Fraser geological province on the southern edge of the Yilgarn craton. The rocks themselves are composed of Garnet-biotite monzogranite gneiss with an age of around 1670 million years.

The camp site has toilets, picnic table and barbeques with space for 30 vehicles.
 
The area is of significance to the Ngadjunmaia peoples. On the south side of the rock are Marlpa initiation grounds. The space has been cleared off  sticks and stones, and there are many old campfires around it.

See also
Granite outcrops of Western Australia

References

Goldfields-Esperance
Rock formations of Western Australia